Coleophora settarii is a moth of the family Coleophoridae. It is found in France, Switzerland, Austria and Italy.

The larvae feed on Artemisia alba, Artemisia caerulescens gallica, Artemisia campestris and Artemisia campestris maritima. They create a yellow-brown tubular silken case, with fine length lines. The case is trivalved, 10–12 mm long and has a mouth angle of about 45°. Larvae can be found September to May.

References

settarii
Moths of Europe
Moths described in 1877